John Wilcox may refer to:

 John Wilcox (Master of Clare College, Cambridge) (1692–1762), Master of Clare 1736–1762
 John Allen Wilcox (1819–1864), American politician
 John W. Wilcox Jr. (1882–1942), American admiral
 Jack Wilcox (1886–1940), British footballer
 John Wilcox (cinematographer) (1913–1979), British cinematographer
 John M. Wilcox (1925–1983), American physicist
 John Wilcox (American football) (born 1938), American football defensive tackle
 Firpo Wilcox (born 1901), American football tackle
 John Wilcox (cricketer) (born 1940), British cricketer